Paul W. Wittemann and Adolph (Walter) Wittemann and Charles Rudolph Wittemann (September 15, 1884 – July 8, 1967) were early aviation pioneers.

Biography
They were the children of Emily Wittemann (née Schirzinger) of Missouri. Their father, * Adolph Wendelin Wittemann was born on Dec. 01. 1846 in Karlsruhe (top right # 218) (Gottesaue)/Germany. Charles and Adolph had a company, C. & A. Wittemann of Staten Island, New York. At Teterboro they built the largest bomber (Witteman-Lewis XNBL-1) of the time. Adolph left the company and Charles teamed up with Samuel P. Lewis to form the Wittemann-Lewis Aircraft Company, Inc.

In 1920 Charles was living in Hackensack, New Jersey. He died in July 1967 in Farmingdale, New Jersey.

Other siblings include Herman Wittemann, aka Harold; Walter; Marie; Elizabeth; and Paul. All the Wittemann children were born in New York City on Staten Island.

Timeline
1884 Birth of Charles Rudolph Wittemann (1884-1967)
1906 Charles and Adolph Wittemann, Aeronautical Engineers, Ocean Terrace & Little Clove Road, Staten Island 
1910 Living on Staten Island 
1917 Charles founder of Teterboro Airport
c. 1917 Wittemann-Lewis Aircraft Company, Inc. founded by Charles Rudolph Wittemann with Samuel P. Lewis
1918 Charles president of Wittemann-Lewis Aircraft Company, Inc. in Newark, New Jersey
1919 Teterboro, New Jersey factory
1919 Contractors to United States Postal Service and United States Navy for aircraft
1920  in the 1920 United States Census with Charles Randolph Wittemann (1884-1967) in Hackensack, New Jersey
1923 Ended production to concentrate on engineering research
1924 Bankruptcy and Teterboro, New Jersey property acquired by Anthony Fokker
1967 Death of Charles Rudolph Wittemann (1884-1967)

Archive
Wichita University
Largest Flying Boat Never Built—the Witteman Air Liner

Patent
Aeroplane

See also
Boland brothers
Wright brothers
Voisin brothers

References

External links
Early Birds: Wittemann brothers
Paul & Walter Wittemann

Members of the Early Birds of Aviation
People from Farmingdale, New Jersey
People from Staten Island
Sibling duos